Henry R. Colman (October 9, 1800 – February 7, 1895) was a Wisconsin pioneer and co-founder of Lawrence University, in Appleton, Wisconsin.

Rev. Henry Root Colman was born October 9, 1800, in Northampton, New York. He was the father of four children: Charles, born 1826, Henry, born 1834, Elihu, born 1841, and Julia. His son Henry served as a trustee of Lawrence University for 60 years.

Church career
He became a minister in 1831. In 1840, he and his family moved to Wisconsin where he was a missionary among the Oneida tribe near Green Bay, and later near Fond du Lac. He was a Methodist minister and one of the first settlers of the area that would become known as Appleton. He was commissioned by Amos Adams Lawrence to establish a frontier school and raise funds to build the school that would be known as Lawrence University. He also assisted in writing the charter of the university and was one of the first trustees of the university.

Later years
Colman died February 7, 1895, in Fond du Lac, aged 94.

Notes

External links 
 Colman family papers, La Crosse Public Library, La Crosse, Wisconsin

Lawrence University
American Methodist clergy
American Methodist missionaries
19th-century Methodist ministers
Religious leaders from Wisconsin
People from Brown County, Wisconsin
People from Fond du Lac County, Wisconsin
1800 births
1895 deaths
Methodist missionaries in the United States
People from Fulton County, New York
People from Appleton, Wisconsin
People from Oneida, Wisconsin
19th-century American clergy